This is a list of doo-wop musicians.

A
The Accents
The Ad Libs
The Alley Cats
Lee Andrews & the Hearts
The Angels
The Aquatones
The Ardells
The Avons

B
Hank Ballard
The Belmonts
The Blenders
The Blue Jays
The Bop Chords
The Bobbettes
The Bosstones
The Buccaneers

C
The Cadets
The Cadillacs
The Capitols
The Capris
The Cap-Tans
The Cardinals
The Casinos
Jimmy Castor
Gene Chandler
The Channels
The Chantels
The Charms
The Charts
The Checkers
The Chevrons
The Chiffons
The Chimes
The Chips
The Chordettes
The Chords (US band)
The Classics
The Cleftones
The Clovers
The Collegians
The Contours
The Corsairs
The Counts
Don Covay and the Goodtimers
The Crests
The Crows
The Crystals
The Cues
The Cufflinks

D
The Danleers
Danny & the Juniors
The Darts
The Del Satins
The Del-Vikings
The Dells
The Delta Rhythm Boys
The Demensions
The Devotions
The Diamonds
Dante & the Evergreens
Dion
Dion and the Belmonts
Don and Juan
The Dreamlovers
The Drifters
The Dubs
The Duprees
The Dynamics

E
The Earls
The Earth Angels
The Echoes
The Edsels
The El Dorados
The Elegants
The Emersons
The Escorts
The Esquires
The Essentials
The Essex
The Extremes

F
The Falcons
The Fiestas
The Firebirds
The Fireflies
The Five Discs
The Five Keys
The Five Satins
The Five Sharps
The Flairs
The Flamingos
The Fleetwoods
The Four Seasons
Norman Fox & The Rob-Roys

G
The Gladiolas
The G-Clefs

H
The Halos
The Harptones
Thurston Harris
The Heartbeats
The Hollywood Flames

I
The Impalas
The Impressions
The Ink Spots
The Innocents
The Isley Brothers

J
Jackie and the Starlites
The Jarmels
Jay and the Americans
The Jesters
The Jewels
The Jive Bombers
The Jive Five
Johnnie & Joe

K
The King Khan & BBQ Show
The Knockouts

L
Richard Lanham
The Larks
Lillian Leach & the Mellows
Little Anthony and the Imperials
Little Caesar & the Romans
Frankie Lymon

M
Johnny Maestro & the Brooklyn Bridge
The Majors
Barry Mann
The Marcels
The Marvelettes
The Marvelows
Marvin & Johnny
Meghan Trainor
The Mello-Kings
The Midnighters
The Miracles
The Mohawks
The Monotones
The Moonglows
The Mystics

N
Nino and the Ebb Tides
The Nutmegs

O
The Olympics
The Orioles
The Overtones
The Orlons

P
The Paradons
The Paragons
The Parliaments
The Penguins
The Platters
The Premiers

Q
The Quin-Tones
The Quotations

R
The Radiants
The Raindrops
Randy & The Rainbows
The Ravens
The Reflections
The Regents
The Rivingtons
Robert & Johnny
Rockin' Chairs
The Ronettes
Ronnie & the Hi-Lites
Rosie and the Originals
Ruben and the Jets
Ruby & the Romantics

S
The Sensations
Rocky Sharpe and the Replays
The Shells
Shep and the Limelites
The Shirelles
The Showmen
The Silhouettes
The Six Teens
The Skyliners
The Solitaires
Bob B. Soxx & the Blue Jeans
The Spaniels
The Stereos
Nolan Strong & the Diablos
The Students
The Sultans
The Swallows

T

The Teenagers
The Tokens
The Turbans
The Tymes

V
The Valentines
Vampiri
Kenny Vance and the Planotones
The Velvets
The Velvetones
The Videos
Vito & the Salutations
The Vocaleers
The Volumes

W
Billy Ward and His Dominoes
The Wildwoods
Maurice Williams and the Zodiacs
Otis Williams and the Charms
The Willows
The Wrens

Y
Kathy Young and the Innocents

Z
The Zippers
The Zirkons

References

Doo wop
 
Doo-wop musicians